The Clergy Act 1640, also known as the Bishops Exclusion Act, or the Clerical Disabilities Act, was an Act of Parliament, effective 13 February 1642.

Prior to the Act, bishops of the Church of England sat in the House of Lords, where they comprised 22 out of a total membership of 60–70 peers. This allowed them to block legislation proposed by the Commons, which was increasingly dominated by Puritans.

"Puritan" was a term for anyone who wanted to reform, or 'purify', the Church of England, and contained many different sects, including Presbyterians, and Congregationalists. Despite differences in doctrine, they opposed bishops, on both religious and political grounds.

Support was limited even among moderates like Viscount Falkland, who wrote; "Those that hated the bishops, hated them more than the Devil; they who loved them, did not love them so well as their dinner."

In 1649, the House of Lords was abolished by the Protectorate; it was restored in 1660, but bishops were not readmitted until the Clergy Act 1661.

Background

In 1642, the vast majority of Englishmen were 'Royalist', in the sense of a shared belief that a 'well-ordered' monarchy was divinely mandated. They disagreed on what 'well-ordered' meant, and who held ultimate authority in clerical affairs. Royalists generally supported a Church of England governed by bishops, appointed by, and answerable to, the king; Parliamentarians, many of whom were Puritans, believed he was answerable to the leaders or Elders of the church, appointed by their congregations.

"Puritan" was a term for anyone who wanted to reform, or 'purify', the Church of England, and contained many different sects. Presbyterians were the most prominent in Parliament, and included leaders like John Pym and John Hampden, but there were many others, such as Congregationalists. Close links between religion and politics added further complexity; one reason for opposition to bishops was their presence in the House of Lords, where they often blocked Parliamentary legislation.

Passage of the Act
In 1629, Charles I dissolved Parliament, initiating the period known as Personal Rule. His use of arbitrary taxes, such as Ship money, was resented, not just because of the way they were levied, but how they were spent. Reforms to the Church of England under Archbishop Laud were viewed as covertly favouring Roman Catholic doctrines, and opposed by many of its clergy. In 1984, historian Patrick Collinson, described Laud as "the greatest calamity ever visited upon the English Church".

Attempts to impose similar reforms on the Church of Scotland, or kirk, led to the 1639 and 1640 Bishops' Wars. Charles refused to call Parliament, crippling his army due to lack of funds; defeat resulted in a Covenanter government, which expelled bishops from the kirk. Shortly after the Long Parliament assembled in November 1640, it was presented with the Root and Branch petition; signed by 15,000 Londoners, this demanded the removal of bishops from the Church of England, evidence of popular opposition to Episcopacy.

At this stage, the petition was not adopted by the Commons, although Laud was impeached, and held in the Tower of London. In the first few months of 1641, the Commons passed a series of constitutional measures; the Triennial Acts, abolition of the Star Chamber, and an end to levying taxes without Parliament's consent. Once again, the bishops ensured all three were rejected by the Lords.

The Commons responded in June with the Bishops Exclusion Bill, removing them from the Lords, which was rejected once again. The outbreak of the Irish Rebellion in October 1641 raised the political temperature; during December, there were widespread riots in Westminster, led by the London apprentices, which resulted in a number of deaths. Suggestions that Pym and other Parliamentary leaders helped to organize these riots have not been proved, but one result was to prevent bishops attending the Lords.

On 30 December, John Williams, Archbishop of York, signed a complaint along with eleven other bishops, disputing the legality of any laws passed by the Lords during their exclusion. This was viewed by the Commons as inviting Charles to dissolve Parliament, and all twelve were arrested on charges of treason. When Charles left London in January, he was accompanied by many Royalist MPs and members of the Lords. This gave his opponents majorities in both houses, and the bill became law in February 1642.

Effect of Act
The Act prevented those in holy orders from exercising any temporal jurisdiction or authority after the 5 February 1641 O.S.; this extended to taking a seat in Parliament or the Privy Council. Any acts carried out with such authority after that date by a member of the clergy were to be considered void.

In 1649, the House of Lords was abolished by the Protectorate, then restored when Charles II returned in 1660; bishops were not readmitted until the 1661 Clergy Act.

References

Sources
 
 
 
  
 
 
 

1642 in England
1642 in law
Acts of the Parliament of England concerning religion
Constitutional laws of England
Christianity and law in the 17th century
Acts of the Parliament of the United Kingdom concerning the House of Lords